Anthene fulvus, the red forewing, is a butterfly in the family Lycaenidae. It is found in Ivory Coast, Ghana, Nigeria (south and the Cross River loop) and western Cameroon. The habitat consists of wet forests.

References

Butterflies described in 1962
Anthene